Battlement Mesa is a census-designated place (CDP) and post office in and governed by Garfield County, Colorado, United States. The CDP is a part of the Glenwood Springs, CO Micropolitan Statistical Area. The Battlement Mesa post office has the ZIP Codes 81635 and 81636 (for post office boxes). At the United States Census 2010, the population of the Battlement Mesa CDP was 4,471, while the population of the 81635 ZIP Code Tabulation Area was 5,957 including the Town of Parachute. The Battlement Mesa Metropolitan District provides services.

Description
The community, which bills itself as a "covenant-controlled community", is primarily a group of contiguous subdivisions developed in the later decades of the 20th century, catering to families and retirees. It is located on the flank of a hill on the south side of the Colorado River, across from the older town of Parachute. The two communities together are known as "Parachute-Battlement Mesa". The town takes its name from Battlement Mesa, an  basalt-topped mesa that sits to the south of the town.

History

The community was first developed by an oil company as a residence for its workers in the expectation that the rising price of oil would make shale oil extraction economically viable. When adjusted oil prices fell, the housing estate was left as a stranded asset, and the oil company marketed it to retirees in conjunction with a real estate firm.

Battlement Mesa Schoolhouse
The Battlement Mesa Schoolhouse, located at 7201 300 Road, is listed on the National Register of Historic Places. The rear portion of the building was built in 1897 with stone from a local quarry. The front portion was added in 1907, also using stone from the same quarry. By the late 1940s, the building was no longer used as a schoolhouse but was used for community gatherings and events. However, the local population declined, and the schoolhouse fell into disuse and was looted and vandalized. In 2003, the State Historical Fund awarded a grant to The Grand Valley Historical Society to restore the school building.

Geography
Battlement Mesa is located in Garfield County on the south side of the Colorado River. It is bordered to the northwest, across the river, by the town of Parachute. Interstate 70 passes through Parachute, providing access to Battlement Mesa from Exit 75. I-70 leads east  to Glenwood Springs, the Garfield County seat, and southwest  to Grand Junction.

Climate
This climatic region is typified by large seasonal temperature differences, with warm to hot summers and cold (sometimes severely cold) winters.  According to the Köppen Climate Classification system, Battlement Mesa has a humid continental climate, abbreviated "Dfb" on climate maps.

Demographics

See also

 List of census-designated places in Colorado

References

External links

 Battlement Mesa @ Colorado.com
 Battlement Mesa Homeowners Association
 Battlement Mesa Metropolitan District
 Battlement Mesa Service Association
 Battlement Mesa Golf Club
 Garfield County website

Census-designated places in Garfield County, Colorado
Census-designated places in Colorado